The Yamhill River is an  tributary of the Willamette River, in the U.S. state of Oregon. The river meanders east past Dayton to join the Willamette River at its river mile (RM) 55 or river kilometer (RK) 89, south of Newberg.

It is likely that Yamhill was the 19th century white settlers' name for a tribe of Native Americans, a Kalapuya people who inhabited the region.  The Yamhill people were among 27 bands and tribes moved to the Grand Ronde Indian Reservation, formally established in 1857.

Course
At about RM 9 (RK 14), Hawn Creek and then Millican Creek enter from the left as the Yamhill nears Lafayette, which lies to the river's left. Beyond Lafayette, Henry Creek enters from the left. Near Dayton, the river passes under Oregon Route 18 before skirting the city, which lies to its right at RM 5 (RK 8). Here Palmer Creek enters from the right. Below Dayton, the river enters the Willamette at its RM 55 (RK 89) south of Newberg.

Lock and dam

In 1900 a Yamhill River lock and dam lock and dam was completed about 1.5 miles downriver from Lafayette, Oregon.  The lock was decommissioned in 1954.  The dam was deliberately destroyed in 1963 to allow better passage for salmon on the river.  The site of the lock and dam is now a county park.

See also
List of Oregon rivers

References

External links

Yamhill Basin Council

Tributaries of the Willamette River
Rivers of Yamhill County, Oregon
Rivers of Oregon